Dame Hinewehi Mohi  (born 1964) is a New Zealand musician and producer, best known for her double-platinum album Oceania (1999) and its lead single "Kotahitanga (Union)", performing the New Zealand National Anthem in Māori during the 1999 Rugby World Cup, and as a producer for the 2019 Māori language compilation album Waiata / Anthems.

As a television producer, Mohi has worked to produce television programmes such as Mōteatea and Marae DIY.

Early life

Mohi was born in Waipukurau in the Hawke's Bay Region, New Zealand, and is of Ngāti Kahungunu and Ngāi Tūhoe descent. She attended St Joseph's Māori Girls' College in Taradale, New Zealand, later receiving a BA in Māori from the University of Waikato in 1985, where she was heavily involved with kapa haka groups. At the University of Waikato, Mohi was mentored by musician and lecturer Hirini Melbourne.

Career

Mohi began working as a television producer in the mid-1980s, focusing on Māori-related content. In 1992, Mohi released her debut single "Kia Ū", a Māori language song describing the mistreatment of Māori in New Zealand. Mohi released her debut album Oceania in 1999, and was a success, becoming double platinum certified in New Zealand. The album, a collaboration with English producer Jaz Coleman, blended Māori language lyrics, melodies and taonga pūoro (traditional instruments) with a 1990s pop house sound. The album's success made Mohi, alongside Moana and the Moahunters, famous for being one of the few musical acts who promoted a distinctively Māori form of popular music.

In 1999, Mohi performed the New Zealand National Anthem at the opening game of the 1999 Rugby World Cup. Mohi was asked to sing the anthem and she requested permission to sing it in both English and Māori but was told that she could only sing it in one language, with the unspoken expectation that it be performed in English. Mohi decided to sing the anthem in Māori instead, which received wide backlash in the New Zealand press at the time. Mohi was bemused by the reaction, after being immersed in spaces in New Zealand that had celebrated Māori culture. This proved to be a turning point, sparking a national conversation about cultural identity and the first language of New Zealand, and is the reason why the anthem had begun to be sung bilingually since the early 2000s.

In the early 2000s, Mohi co-founded the Raukatauri Music Therapy Centre with her husband George Bradfield. They were inspired to create the centre because of their daughter (who suffers from cerebral palsy) and her experiences with music therapy in London. In 2004 Mohi set up the television production company Raukatauri Productions, which has produced shows such as Mōteatea and Marae DIY, which won the best reality show award at the 2007 Qantas Television Awards. In 2013, Mohi released Raukatauri – Te Puhi o Te Tangi, an album reimagining her songs in collaboration with the Auckland Chamber Orchestra.

Mohi produced and curated the 2019 album Waiata / Anthems, a compilation album released for te Wiki o te Reo Māori (Māori Language Week), where popular New Zealand musicians re-recorded their songs in Māori. The album debuted at number 1 on the Official New Zealand Music Chart. Due to the success of the album, the project was revived in 2021, becoming Waiata Anthems Week, an annual celebration of music recorded in Te Reo Māori.

As a member of APRA, Mohi mentors musicians to promote the development of Māori music. In her capacity as Apra Amcos Māori development leader Mohi led the project of Lorde's te Reo Māori EP Te Ao Mārama. Mohi sings on "Hua Pirau / Fallen Fruit".

Honours and recognition 
Mohi was appointed a Member of the New Zealand Order of Merit in the 2008 Birthday Honours for her services to Māori.

In 2015, Mohi was awarded the Distinguished Alumni Award by the University of Waikato. She was inducted into the New Zealand Hall of Fame for Women Entrepreneurs in 2020.

In the 2021 Queen's Birthday Honours, Mohi was promoted to Dame Companion of the New Zealand Order of Merit, for services to Māori, music and television.

Personal life

Mohi's daughter was born in 1996. Mohi was diagnosed with breast cancer in 2011.

Discography

Studio albums

Singles

Notes

References

1964 births
20th-century New Zealand women singers
21st-century New Zealand women singers
New Zealand Māori women singers
Living people
New Zealand women singer-songwriters
New Zealand record producers
New Zealand television producers
Ngāi Tūhoe people
Ngāti Kahungunu people
People from Waipukurau
University of Waikato alumni
Dames Companion of the New Zealand Order of Merit
Māori-language singers
Singers awarded knighthoods